Birgitta Wolff (born 14 July 1965 in Münster) is a German economist and politician of the Christian Democratic Union (CDU). She served as minister of education and culture and as minister of research and economy in the state government of Saxony-Anhalt from 2010 to 2013, and as president of the Goethe University of Frankfurt from 2015 to 2020.

Academic career
Wolff studied at Witten/Herdecke University, LMU and Harvard University. After her Habilitation at LMU, she taught at the Edmund A. Walsh School of Foreign Service at Georgetown University (1999–2000), and became professor of business administration and international management at the Otto-von-Guericke University Magdeburg. In 2002, she spent a year at the Stanford Graduate School of Business. She has been a visiting professor at universities in Ukraine, Brazil and China.

In 2014 she was elected as president of the Goethe University Frankfurt, and she held the office from 1 January 2015 to 31 December 2020. Her re-election failed in two ballots, and her successor Enrico Schleiff was elected in the 3rd ballot with 18 of 34 votes.

Political career
In 2010, Wolff became state minister of education and culture in the state government of Minister-President Reiner Haseloff of Saxony-Anhalt. From 2011 to 2013, she served as state minister of research and economy.

Other activities (selection)

Corporate boards
 Deutsche Bank, member of the advisory board (since 2017)
 Norddeutsche Landesbank (NORD/LB), member of the advisory board

University bodies
 Botanical Garden, Goethe University Frankfurt, ex officio member of the board of trustees (2015–2021)
 Frankfurt Institute for Advanced Studies, Goethe University Frankfurt, ex officio member of the board of trustees (2015–2021)
 Fritz Bauer Institute, Goethe University Frankfurt, ex officio member of the board of trustees (2015–2021)
 Frobenius Institute, Goethe University Frankfurt, ex officio member of the board of trustees (2015–2021)
 House of Finance, Goethe University Frankfurt, ex officio member of the board of trustees (2015–2021)
 Institute for Law and Finance, Goethe University Frankfurt, Member of the Board of Trustees (2015–2021)
 Institute for Monetary and Financial Stability (IMFS), Goethe University Frankfurt, ex officio member of the board of trustees (2015–2021)
 Institute for Social Research (IfS), Goethe University Frankfurt, ex officio member of the board of trustees (2015–2021)
 Museum Giersch, Goethe University Frankfurt, ex officio member of the advisory board (2015–2021)
 Paul Ehrlich Foundation, Goethe University Frankfurt, ex officio member of the board of trustees (2015–2021)
 University Hospital Frankfurt, Goethe University Frankfurt, ex officio member of the board of trustees (2015–2021)

Non-profit organizations
 Federal Agency for Disruptive Innovation (SPRIN-D), Deputy Chairwoman of the Supervisory Board (since 2020)
 Max Planck Institute for Brain Research, Member of the Board of Trustees (since 2016)
 International Building Exhibition (IBA) Urban Redevelopment 2010, ex officio member of the board of trustees
 Centre for Higher Education (CHE), member of the advisory board
 Ernst Strüngmann Institute (ESI), member of the advisory board
 Fazit-Stiftung, member of the board of trustees
 Peace Research Institute Frankfurt (HSFK), member of the board of trustees
 Humboldt University, member of the scientific advisory board
 Konrad Adenauer Foundation (KAS), member of the board of trustees
 Marketing Club Frankfurt, member of the board of trustees
 Leopoldina, member of the Senate
 Senckenberg Nature Research Society, member of the board of trustees
 Volkswagen Foundation, Member of the Board of Trustees
 Center for Science and Research Management (ZWM), member of the board
 Johanna-Quandt-Universitätsstiftung, member of the advisory board
 Stifterverband für die Deutsche Wissenschaft, member of the Hightech Forum
 ZDF, member of the board of directors (since 2017)

References 

German economists
Academic staff of Goethe University Frankfurt
Christian Democratic Union of Germany politicians
Walsh School of Foreign Service faculty
Stanford University faculty
Ludwig Maximilian University of Munich alumni
Harvard University alumni
Ministers of the Saxony-Anhalt State Government
1965 births
Living people
People from Münster